A sandwich cookie, also known as a sandwich biscuit, is a type of cookie made from two thin cookies or medium cookies with a filling between them. Many types of fillings are used, such as cream, ganache, buttercream, chocolate, cream cheese, jam, peanut butter, lemon curd, or ice cream.

List of sandwich cookies/biscuits
Brand names:
 Bourbon biscuit, thin rectangular dark chocolate-flavoured biscuits with a chocolate buttercream filling
 E.L. Fudge Cookies, butter-flavoured shortbread cookies with a fudge creme filling
 Happy Faces, shortcake with a raspberry jam and cream filling
 Hydrox, creme-filled chocolate sandwich cookie manufactured by Leaf Brands
 Jammie Dodgers, shortbread with a raspberry or strawberry flavoured jam filling
 Milano, thin layer of chocolate sandwiched between two biscuit cookies
 Monte Carlo (biscuit), sweet biscuits sandwiching a creamy filling
 Moon Pie, marshmallow sandwiched between two graham cracker cookies and dipped in a flavoured coating
 Nutter Butter, peanut-shaped cookies with a peanut butter filling
 Nutty Bars, wafers with peanut butter and covered in chocolate
 Oatmeal Creme Pie, hand mounded oatmeal cookies with a creme filling
 Oreo, a line of sandwich cookies—most notably a creme-filled chocolate sandwich cookie modelled after Hydrox manufactured by Mondelez International
 Prince de LU, biscuits with chocolate cream
 SnackWell's creme sandwich, an oblong fat-free cookie
 Tim Tam, malted biscuit cookies with a chocolate cream filling, with a chocolate coating
 Wagon Wheels, biscuits with marshmallow filling, covered in a chocolate

Generic names:
 Custard cream, creamy, custard-flavoured centre between flat biscuits
 Macaron, sweet meringue-based confection
 Maple leaf cream cookies, maple leaf-shaped cookies with maple cream filling
 Wafer, a crisp, often sweet, very thin, flat, and dry biscuit
 Whoopie pie, round, mound-shaped pieces of cake with a sweet, creamy filling

See also

 Ice cream sandwich
 
 Dirt cake
 List of cookies

References

External links

 

 
Cookie, Sandwich